Masuren was a 2,385 ton cargo ship  which was built in 1935. She was seized by Britain in 1945 and renamed Empire Annan. In 1950 she was renamed Thomas N Epiphaniades and then Helga Böge in 1952. In 1959, she was renamed Fuhlsbüttel. She served until 1964 when she was scrapped in Bremerhaven.

Building
F Schichau GmbH built Masuren at its Danzig shipyard as yard number 1349. Her launch date unrecorded but she was completed in October 1935. Schichau made her engines at its works in Elbing. Masuren was powered by a four-cylinder compound steam engine plus low-pressure steam turbine.

Service history
Her first owner was Kohlen-Import & Poseidon Schiffahrt AG and she was registered in Königsberg. Masuren served for ten years until she was seized in Copenhagen by the United Kingdom at the end of the Second World War in 1945. Her port of registry had been changed to Nordenham in that year. Ownership passed to the Ministry of War Transport, who renamed her Empire Annan, and contracted Crosby, Sons & Co to manage her. She was registered in London.

In 1947 Empire Annan passed to the United States Maritime Commission, New York who sold her in 1948 to Fanmaur Shipping & Trading Co, New York in 1948. They sold her in 1950 to Thomas N Epiphaniades, Volos, Greece who renamed her Thomas N Epiphaniades. In 1952 Thomas N Epiphaniades was sold to Johann MK Blumenthal, Hamburg and renamed Helga Böge. She served with them for seven years and was auctioned in 1959 to  Koehn & Bohlmann Reederei KG, Hamburg. She was renamed Fuhlsbüttel in 1960, serving for a further four years until 1964 when she was scrapped in Bremerhaven.

Identification
Masurens call sign was DADE when she was registered in Königsberg and DHQZ when she was registered in Nordenhamn. Empire Annan had the UK official number 180633 and call sign GLTG. Official numbers were a forerunner to IMO numbers.

References

1935 ships
Ships built in Danzig
Steamships of Germany
Merchant ships of Germany
World War II merchant ships of Germany
Empire ships
Ministry of War Transport ships
Steamships of the United Kingdom
Merchant ships of the United Kingdom
Merchant ships of the United States
Steamships of Greece
Merchant ships of Greece
Ships built by Schichau